Brooke Hathaway is a fictional character from the British Channel 4 soap opera Hollyoaks, played by Tylan Grant. Grant made their first appearance as Brooke in episode 4947, originally broadcast on 10 July 2018. Brooke is introduced as an autistic teenager who is fostered by the Osborne family and is the first autistic regular character in a soap opera; Grant is also the first BAME actor to portray an autistic character in a television series. Brooke's storylines in the soap have included being adopted by the Osbornes following the death of their mother, their relationships with Imran Maalik (Ijaz Rana) and Oliver Morgan (Aedan Duckworth/Gabriel Clark), being bullied by Juliet Nightingale (Niamh Blackshaw), becoming pregnant and putting their son up for adoption and coming to the realisation that they are non-binary.

Grant has expressed gratitude for being able to portray Brooke due to the explorations of Brooke's autism and non-binary identity. As Grant is autistic and non-binary, they were glad to convey both of these qualities through Brooke, hoping Brooke could act as representation for those respective groups of people. For their portrayal of Brooke, Grant has been nominated for Best Soap Newcomer at the 2018 Digital Spy Reader Awards, the 2019 British Soap Award for Best Newcomer and Celebrity of the Year at the 2019 National Diversity Awards. Brooke's coming out scene was also nominated for Feel-Good Moment at the upcoming Inside Soap Awards.

Casting and characterisation
The character and Grant's casting details were announced on 23 April 2018. Brooke was billed as a "strong, independent character" who knows what it is like to be a teenager with autism. It was confirmed that Brooke has high-functioning autism and executive producer Bryan Kirkwood said that Brooke understands how their condition can affect their life, stating that Brooke experiences the world "a hundred times more intensely" than neurotypical people. He explained that having ice cream with someone can become a cherished experience for Brooke and that a nasty remark from a schoolteacher could "cut Brooke to the core". Kirkwood added: "every light shines brighter, every smell is stronger – and every word [Brooke] takes to heart that little bit more." While appearing on Loose Women, Grant told the panel that they are different to Brooke in real life, as they have a different form of autism to their character. They added how exciting it was to represent autism on a mainstream media platform. Hollyoaks placed an open casting call for somebody to portray the character and worked with charity the National Autistic Society and theatre company Access All Areas during the creation and casting processes, as well as working with Grant when developing the character. Grant stated that they enjoy appearing in Hollyoaks and was proud to represent autistic women in television, something which they felt was not portrayed enough, and noted that autistic women of colour are particularly unrepresented in media. Kirkwood was pleased with Grant's casting as Brooke, labelling them as a "brilliant new talent", and describing their auditions as "joyful".

Storylines
The child of Fran, the murderer of Becca Dean (Ali Bastian), Brooke first appears when spying on Becca's sister, Nancy Osborne (Jessica Fox), who Fran has been in contact with. Brooke then signs up for Nancy's tutoring classes and during a session, they reveal to Nancy that they are Fran's child and that Fran is dying. Brooke and Nancy visit Fran in hospital and Fran begs for Nancy's forgiveness. Fran later dies, leaving Brooke alone. Not wanting Brooke to be sent into the foster care system, Nancy convinces Jack (Jimmy McKenna) and Darren (Ashley Taylor Dawson) that they should foster Brooke. Although initially wary of Brooke at first though, Darren eventually agrees and they convince the social worker to let Brooke stay with them. Brooke develops a connection with Oliver Morgan, and the two go on a coffee date together. However, after seeing Oliver in the changing rooms at the football academy with his football coach Buster Smith (Nathan Sussex), Brooke sees Buster putting his hand on Oliver's knee. The next day in the morning, she outs him as gay to his stepmother Mandy Morgan (Sarah Jayne Dunn). Unknown to Brooke, Oliver is being groomed by Buster and in retaliation, Oliver shouts at Brooke by calling them an idiot and denying the accusations, causing Brooke to have a breakdown. Brooke also forms a connection with Imran Maalik (Ijaz Rana), but ends their relationship after finding out that he has been abusing his mother Misbah (Harvey Virdi) and his sister Yasmine (Haiesha Mistry). Afterwards, Brooke begins dating Oliver.

Juliet Nightingale (Niamh Blackshaw) joins Hollyoaks High, and begins bullying Brooke. Juliet takes every opportunity to belittle and embarrass Brooke, including making them miss an important exam, causing them to collapse from sensory overload, and trying to sabotage Brooke's relationship with Oliver. Brooke becomes pregnant but doesn't feel ready to become a parent, despite Ollie being ready. Brooke arranges to have the baby adopted and later gives birth to a son, Thierry. Thierry is adopted by Mal (David Grant) and Zoe (Carrie Grant). When Brooke and Oliver are about to attend a party, Brooke worries due to having forgotten their noise cancelling earbuds, and states that they want to go home. Oliver lashes out at them, claiming that their relationship revolves around what Brooke wants and that they never do anything in favour of him. In response, Brooke ends their relationship. Oliver then leaves the village without saying anything to Brooke.

Upon Oliver's (now Gabriel Clark) return to the village, he apologises and the two reconcile their relationship. However, after Brooke learns that Oliver is addicted to drugs and has had sex with Juliet while on a drug high, Brooke ends their relationship again. In a bid to move on from Oliver, Brooke forms a band with Imran and Sid Sumner (Billy Price). Brooke forms a friendship with clothing stall owner Ripley Lennox (Ki Griffin), who recommends a piece of men's clothing to Brooke. Brooke likes the clothing but does not want to wear men's clothing; however, Ripley gifts Brooke the clothes and leaves a note saying that all clothing is genderless. Brooke later overhears Ripley speaking about how they are non-binary, and in response to Brooke's confusion about their identity, Ripley explains. Brooke relates to aspects of being non-binary and begins to wear men's clothing to test their boundaries. After Brooke is uncomfortable to be voted prom queen, they come to the realisation that they are non-binary. Brooke then comes out to a supportive Juliet and Imran.

Development
Kirkwood stated that Brooke would be introduced with a secret. Further details about Brooke's introduction were released on 1 July 2018, and it was revealed that Brooke is the daughter of Fran Hathaway, who murdered Becca Dean (Ali Bastian) in 2007. Digital Spy stated that for Nancy, Brooke would serve as a "permanent reminder" of Fran murdering her sister and hinted that there would be "tough times" ahead. They also hinted that while Nancy taking in Brooke could be a step too far, it could simultaneously "add some light to one of the darkest times of her life". Speaking about their own autism, Grant stated that they "know that [they are] not like everyone else", and that like them, Brooke has faced those difficulties and challenges of feeling different. Grant continued: "I think that [Brooke] has really embraced it and I know that I have embraced my difference, like, over the years and so I know that I can use that to do amazing things, like I'm doing now bringing awareness." Grant stated that when they joined the cast of Hollyoaks, the production team had autism training, so that when there is a loud noise, Grant can go into another room. They stated that while it is simple, it is helpful for them. The actor also applauded the programme for embracing Brooke as a character, commenting: "I think it's really good that Hollyoaks has been able to represent an autistic person, because it is bringing so much awareness and I've had people reach out to me. I would have loved to have someone growing up that had autism that was open about it that was an actor that I could resonate with." Grant added that it was important for an autistic actor like themselves to portray Brooke due to the immediate understanding that someone with autism would have.

In January 2020, Grant's real life parents appeared in Hollyoaks as the adoptive parents of Brooke's son, Thierry. Grant's father David described the experience as a "role reversal", noting Grant's experience on a set is much larger than his. Grant's mother Carrie echoed his comments, adding that it was a special experience, and that having Tylan alongside them "made it like it was more home-life than work!" The parents also described how it was difficult to differentiate between Grant in real life and Brooke as a character. David stated that he "had to get myself into a headspace"  where he was not watching his real child, but was watching Brooke, with Carrie confessing that she did not do a great job of differentiating the character from their child.

In an interview on the Hollyoaks YouTube channel at the end of 2020, Grant talked about Brooke's attitude to life. They explained that Brooke is finding their true identity while also trying to battle the external world. They explained that Brooke's goal is "getting by", trying to "find a light at the end of the tunnel" and trying to find the positives in life. Grant said that Brooke is "looking inside more" and trying to understand their own self, rather than attempting to understand the world. Grant opined that life is throwing its problems at Brooke, referring to Brooke's pregnancy and breakup with Oliver. They stated that it had taken a toll on Brooke's emotions, but that ultimately, the decision to leave Oliver was right due to the situation being "destructive" for the character. Grant noted that although the decision was right for Brooke, they were upset about the breakup due to enjoying filming with Clark. When asked what advice they would give Brooke, Grant replied that they would tell Brooke that "this is just a chapter of your life, and it can feel like more, but the only thing that is certain is that nothing is certain. So just keep going."

After Brooke comes out as non-binary, actor Grant said that the storyline meant a lot to them due to being non-binary in real life. Grant found the "progression of Brooke's self growth and self discovery" emotional and empowering. They hoped that Brooke could act as representation for people confused about their identities, as well as people coming to terms with who they are. Grant also felt that Brooke is the representation they wish that they had when they were younger.

Reception
In a piece on the character, Jay Tee Rattray, an autistic person who advocates for disabled representation in media, praised Brooke. She stated that she was "delighted" to learn of the introduction of an autistic character and especially praised the usage of an autistic actor such as Grant to portray Brooke. Rattray praised Brooke's first scenes on Hollyoaks, noting the scenes where sounds that Brooke could hear were amplified for viewers to understand Brooke's point of view. She went on to say that when watching Brooke, there was "something different" about the way Brooke's characterisation was shown. Rattray explained that "there was no weird voice, no blank expression, it was completely natural", and that unlike other television series, there were obvious signs that Brooke is autistic without it being stereotypical. Rattray also complimented Grant's portrayal of the character, stating that they bring "real heart to everything Brooke does" and commended Grant's "incredibly expressive face which makes [Brooke] incredibly watchable". Rattray felt that other forms of media tend to portray autistic characters as emotionless and appreciated that Brooke is different. Rattray also applauded the way Hollyoaks handle Brooke's direct nature, writing that it would be easy to make it a source of comedy or drama, but they do not. Rattray admired that they put Brooke within the Osborne family, due to Nancy having multiple sclerosis and Oscar Osborne (Noah Holdworth) being deaf, but noted that the family is never centred on their disabilities, but it is made part of their regular life. Rattray's only criticism was that in Brooke's first few months on the series, they had only been to seen develop romantic relationships rather than friendships.

For their portrayal of Brooke, Grant was nominated for Best Soap Newcomer at the 2018 Digital Spy Reader Awards; they came in eighth place with 3.9% of the total votes. In 2019, they received a nomination for Best Newcomer at the British Soap Awards, as well as a nomination for Best Young Actor at the Inside Soap Awards. Grant was also shortlisted for Celebrity of the Year at the National Diversity Awards, who stated that they "made history" for being the first BAME actor to portray an autistic character in a mainstream drama series. In 2021, Brooke's coming out scene was nominated for Feel-Good Moment at the Inside Soap Awards.

See also
 List of Hollyoaks characters (2018)
 Autism spectrum disorders in the media
 List of autistic fictional characters
 List of LGBT characters in soap operas
 List of fictional non-binary characters

References

Fictional Black British people
Fictional characters on the autism spectrum
Fictional teenage parents
Fictional LGBT characters in television
Fictional non-binary people
Fictional salespeople
Hollyoaks characters
Teenage characters in television
Television characters introduced in 2018